Mastro may refer to:
 Mastro, Greece, a village in Aetolia-Acarnania, Greece
 Dean Del Mastro, Canadian politician
 Michael Mastro, American property developer 
 Michael Mastro, American Broadway and film actor